Cuz I Can may refer to:

Cuz I Can (album), a 2004 album by the Swedish pop rock singer Ana Johnsson
"Coz I Can", a 2004 single from the album, also released as "Cuz I Can"
Cuz I Can" (Pink song), a 2005 song
"Cozican", a 1996 song by Hardknox from their self-titled album